Hossam Ould Zmirli (born November 7, 1984, in Hussein Dey, Alger, Algeria) is an Algerian football player.

Club career
 2002-2003 RC Kouba (Juniors) 
 2003-2007 RC Kouba 
 2007-2008 USM Alger

References

External links
 USM-Alger.com Profile

1984 births
Algerian footballers
Living people
Footballers from Algiers
USM Alger players
RC Kouba players
Association footballers not categorized by position
21st-century Algerian people